Wilhelm Klatte (13 February 1870 – 25 July 1930) was a German music theoretician, pedagogue, journalist and conductor.

Life 
Born in Bremen, after studying music in Leipzig, Klatte began his professional career as a musician first at the Deutsches Nationaltheater und Staatskapelle Weimar with Richard Strauss. During this time he was also active as a conductor on various occasions. In 1897 he became the first music consultant at the Berliner Lokal-Anzeiger. From 1904 Klatte also taught music theory at the Stern Conservatory in Berlin, where he was appointed professor in 1919. His students there included Else Schmitz-Gohr. Since 1925 he had also held a teaching position for theory at the Royal Music Institute of Berlin.

Klatte also held several honorary posts.

Klatte died in Berlin at the age of 60.

Work 
 Zur Geschichte der Programm-Musik, 1905
 Franz Schubert, 1907
 Aufgaben für den einfachen Kontrapunkt, 1915
 Grundlagen des mehrstimmigen Satzes (Harmonielehre), 1922
 Das Sternsche Konservatorium der Musik zu Berlin, 1925

Further reading 
 Hugo Riemann: Riemann Musiklexikon 11th edition, edited by Alfred Einstein. Max Hesse Verlag, Berlin 1929, 
 Wilhelm Kosch (edit.): Deutsches Theater-Lexikon. Volume II, Hurka–Pallenberg. De Gruyter, Berlin [among others.] 1960, .  (retrieved via De Gruyter Online).

References

External links 
 
 

German music theorists
German music journalists
German music educators
German conductors (music)
1870 births
1930 deaths
Writers from Bremen